The year 1946 was the 165th year of the Rattanakosin Kingdom of Thailand. It was the twelfth and last year in the reign of King Ananda Mahidol (Rama VIII), the first year in the reign of Bhumibol Adulyadej (Rama IX), and is reckoned as year 2489 in the Buddhist Era.

Incumbents
King: 
 until 9 June: Ananda Mahidol 
 starting 9 June: Bhumibol Adulyadej
Crown Prince: (vacant)
Prime Minister: 
 until 31 January: Seni Pramoj
 31 January-24 March: Khuang Aphaiwong
 24 March-23 August: Pridi Banomyong
 starting 23 August: Thawan Thamrongnawasawat
Supreme Patriarch: Vajirananavongs

Events

January

February

March

April

May

June

July

August

September

October

November

December

Births

Deaths

See also
 List of Thai films of 1946

References

External links

 
Thailand
Years of the 20th century in Thailand
Thailand
1940s in Thailand